The Department of Repatriation was an Australian government department that existed between December 1975 and October 1976.

Scope
Information about the department's functions and/or government funding allocation could be found in the Administrative Arrangements Orders, the annual Portfolio Budget Statements and in the Department's annual report.

The functions of the Department at its creation were defined as repatriation and other benefits for members of the Defence Forces and their dependants:

Structure
The Department was a Commonwealth Public Service department, staffed by officials who were responsible to the Minister for Repatriation and Compensation. The Department's Secretary was Richard Kingsland.

References

Repatriation
Ministries established in 1975